Petrophile vana is a species of flowering plant in the family Proteaceae and is endemic to Western Australia. It is a shrub with needle-shaped, sharply-pointed leaves, and spherical to oval heads of small numbers of hairy, white flowers.

Description
Flowering has been observed in September and the fruit is a small nut.

Taxonomy
Petrophile vana was first formally described in 2007 by Raymond Jeffrey Cranfield and Terry Desmond Macfarlane in the journal Nuytsia from material collected by Cranfield on Melangata Station in 1987. The specific epithet (vana) means "empty, idle or worthless", but said by the authors to mean "trifling, referring to the non-showy appearance of the plant".

Distribution and habitat
This petrophile is only known from a few locations in the Murchison and  Yalgoo biogeographic regions where it grows in shallow, gritty clay soils over laterite, sometimes in heath with Thryptomene species.

Conservation status
Petrophile vana is classified as "Priority One" by the Government of Western Australia Department of Parks and Wildlife, meaning that it is known from only one or a few locations which are potentially at risk.

References

vana
Eudicots of Western Australia
Endemic flora of Western Australia
Plants described in 2007
Taxa named by Terry Desmond Macfarlane